Obsessed (lit. "Human Addiction" or "Human Intoxication") is a 2014 South Korean erotic romance film written and directed by Kim Dae-woo, about a couple having a passionate affair in a military camp under tight surveillance in 1969.

Plot
Decorated war hero Colonel Kim Jin-pyong is on the verge of his promotion to general. From his commander father-in-law to beautiful wife, Jin-pyong is the subject of much envy and jealousy. But his affection for his wife has subsided long ago, and due to post-traumatic disorder from the Vietnam War, he suffers mental breakdowns and nightmares of the fallen soldiers under his command.

One day, Captain Kyung Woo-jin is transferred to Jin-pyong's troop and he moves in next door with his wife Ga-heun. Jin-pyong encounters Ga-heun and instantly falls in love with her. He has never felt this emotion in his life and is confused by it. He is later invited to an event at an army hospital organized by the wives of commissioned officers, where they volunteer. A patient suffering from PTSD attacks Ga-heun, and Jin-pyong jumps in to help her. He saves her from the patient, but she gets shot in the process and is admitted to the hospital. She begins to develop cordial feelings for Jin-pyong for risking his own life to save her from the vicious attack.

Jin-pyong and Ga-heun meet in complete secrecy and share their own memories. Over time, their love for one another blossoms to maturity. As the two enjoy their secret love affair, Ga-heun receives a call that her mother is ill and immediately goes to the hospital and there they are met by Ga-heun's mother-in-law. Her mother-in-law raised Ga-heun when she lost her family as if she was one of her own children, and Ga-heun's guilt leads her to end her affair with Jin-pyong. He has no choice but to go along with her decision.

Jin-pyong has a hard time getting over her, and he schemes to falsely accuse Woo-jin for something he did not do, but the scheme does not work. It is a living hell to see Ga-heun giving him the cold shoulder, adding to the fact that she is so close by, being in the same base, and living next door to her.

Jin-pyong is finally promoted to general, and a celebration party is held. Ga-heun and Woo-jin also attend the party. Jin-pyong is surrounded by people congratulating him, but he can only scan the room for a glimpse of Ga-heun. He gets drunk by the end of the night, and not being able to contain his feelings any longer, he shouts why she had to leave him, completely exposing their secret affair to the entire army.

In a fit of rage for insulting his daughter, his father-in-law decides to send Jin-pyong back to Vietnam. Jin-pyong pleases Ga-heun that he's willing to give up his army career for her. But she says she's not so in love with him that she's willing to give up her life. He is devastated by her response and attempts to commit suicide. He fails even that and leaves the base for Vietnam.

Two years later, while attending an official party, a group of Special Unit men approach Ga-heun. They tell her that Jin-pyong died on the battlefield, and give her one thing. In his dying moment, he reached out for a polaroid photograph of Ga-heun and himself. Even though the affair was short, the polaroid captured a happy moment of the two ballroom dancing. On the back, a short phrase is written on it – “My Love”.

Cast
Song Seung-heon as Colonel Kim Jin-pyeong
Lim Ji-yeon as Jong Ga-heun
Jo Yeo-jeong as Lee Sook-jin, Jin-pyeong's wife
On Joo-wan as Kyung Woo-jin, Ga-heun's husband
Yoo Hae-jin as Im, the Renaissance Music Hall owner
Park Hyuk-kwon as Colonel Choi, Jin-pyeong's office aide
Jeon Hye-jin as Choi's wife
Bae Seong-woo as Jo Hak-soo
Uhm Tae-goo as Warrant officer Kim
Ye Soo-jung as Woo-jin's mother
Yoon Da-kyung as Ga-heun's mother
Oh Hee-joon as Soldier on duty
Jung Sang-chul as Chief of staff
Jung Won-joong as Brigadier general
Yeon Je-wook as Hospital patient
Lee Seung-joon as Chief medical officer

Marketing
When the film studio uploaded racy teaser photos from the movie on April 24, 2014, more than 4.7 million people logged onto the official website. Industry insiders noted that the interest in the film was remarkable, because the marketing team wasn't able to conduct any promotional activity due to the recent sinking of the MV Sewol incident. The hype was mostly attributed to actor Song Seung-heon, since Obsessed was his first R-rated romance film.

Release
Obsessed was released on May 14, 2014. It debuted at No. 1 in the local box office, drawing 445,490 admissions and making  on its first week.

Music
The first teaser used "La Danse" by Stefano Barzan and "A Table for Two" by Didier Goret. The second teaser used "Regal Portrait" by Philip Sheppard. The trailer used "Les Abers" by Christophe Delabre and "Regal Portrait" by Philip Sheppard.

The music featured in the tennis match and car sex scene is the second movement of Alessandro Marcello's Concerto in D minor with piano performance by Moon Jin-tak and nylon guitar performance by Hwang Min-woong. "The Rose" in the closing credits is performed by Japanese singer Aoi Teshima.

Awards and nominations

References

External links
  
 
 
 

2014 films
2010s erotic films
2010s romantic thriller films
Erotic romance films
2010s erotic thriller films
Films directed by Kim Dae-woo
Films with screenplays by Kim Dae-woo
South Korean erotic thriller films
South Korean romantic thriller films
Films about the Republic of Korea Armed Forces
2010s South Korean films